Luigi Donato (late 15th century – early 16th century) was an Italian painter, known for altarpieces, and active in and near Como.

Biography
According to Luigi Lanzi, he was putatively a pupil of Vincenzo Civerchio (c. 1470 – c. 1544). Circa 1495, Donato painted a large polyptych, of which now remains the Ancona di Moltrasio.

References

15th-century births
16th-century deaths
People from Como
15th-century Italian painters
Italian male painters
16th-century Italian painters
Italian Renaissance painters